V.O.S (Hangul: 브이오에스; an acronym for Voice of Soul) is a South Korean R&B boy band formed in 2004. The group is composed of three members: Choi Hyun-joon, Kim Kyung-rok and Park Ji-heon. Park Ji-heon departed from the group in 2010, but returned in 2015 when the group signed with Happy Face Entertainment.

Discography

Studio albums

Compilation albums

Extended plays

Awards and nominations

References

South Korean boy bands
South Korean contemporary R&B musical groups
South Korean pop music groups
Musical groups established in 2004
2004 establishments in South Korea
South Korean musical trios